Frank Van Herwegen (born in Schoten, Belgium on December 10, 1970) better known as DJ F.R.A.N.K., sometimes DJ Frank, DJ F.R.A.N.K or Dj F.r.a.n.k. is a Belgian DJ and record producer with great number of charting hits in Belgium, and at times in the Netherlands, France and Finland.

He started at 16, DJing at social events and worked as a record seller in Antwerp working for 4 years. In 1995, he opened a private DJ store with his a DJ colleague, AJ Duncan and DJed at DIXIES Brasschaat.

His most lucrative period came when in the early 2000s, when he was included in the Belgian-German dance group The Underdog Project as the band's remixer. The 4-member band also included Crag Smart and Vic Krishna on vocals and AJ Duncan on keyboards. It released the commercially successful album It Doesn't Matter that reached number 2 in both German and Australian albums charts.

The project enjoyed big hits like "Summer Jam", "Saturday Night", "Tonight, "Girls of Summer" amongst many others. "Summer Jam" was certified gold in France and Germany, and double platinum in Belgium and the Netherlands. "Saturday Night" became a pan-European hit charting in Belgium, Finland, France, Netherlands, Denmark, Norway and Sweden.

The single "My Arms Keep Missing You" in the summer of 2006 was a big charting hit in collaboration with Danzel, a Belgian musician of house, techno and dance. Between 2006 and 2008, he also released hits with the pseudonym Frank Ti-Aya in cooperation with Yardi Don, an alter ego name for artist Craig Smart. He reached the top of the Belgian Ultratop chart in 2011 with "Discotex! (Yah!)", his highest charting solo hit.

Discography

Singles
Solo and collaborations

as part of The Underdog Project
(selective)
2000: "Summer Jam"
2000: "Tonight"
2002: "Saturday Night"
2003: "Summer Jam (2003)"

See more details and chart positions in discography of The Underdog Project article

As Frank Ti-Aya

Featured in recordings

*Did not appear in the official Belgian Ultratop 50 charts, but rather in the bubbling under Ultratip charts.

References

1970 births
Living people
Belgian DJs
People from Schoten